Clement Throckmorton may refer to:

 Clement Throckmorton (died 1573) (c. 1512–1573), English landowner and Member of Parliament
 Clement Throckmorton (MP for Warwickshire), English politician who sat in the House of Commons between 1624 and 1626
 Clement Throckmorton (died 1663) (1630–1663), English politician who sat in the House of Commons variously between 1656 and 1663